Tunis is a village in the oasis of Faiyum Governorate in Egypt known for its pottery workshops and small art galleries.

History 
The village is considered new as it was created in the 1960s by two famous Egyptian poets. In the 1980s, Evelyne Porret, a Swiss tourist and later potter fell in love with the touristic village, and established a pottery school in it that played a large role in preseving fayoum's Ancient Egyptian pottery culture. The pottery school still exists today.

Institutions

Fayoum Art Center 
Mohamed Abla, an Egyptian artist, founded Fayoum Art Center in 2006. It is a non-profit organization which was inspired by the International Summer Academy in Salzburg. The Center is dedicated to all the artists around the world. It helps artists by giving them studio spaces they need, besides providing them with art libraries and living areas. Additionally, the first Caricature Museum in the Middle East was built in the center. The museum includes a variety of collection of caricature.

Ibis Cooking School and Restaurant 
Not only the village is limited to the art of pottery, but also it combines both the art of pottery with the cooking. There is Ibis Cooking School and Restaurant that is located at Mahmoud Youssef Pottery Atelier.

Events

Tunis Village Annual Handicrafts Festival 
There is a festival held in Fayoum Village annually; it takes place every autumn. The purpose of the festival is to bring artists-potters from Tunis, Cairo, other parts of Egypt and also artists from around the world. The festival focuses on giving the chance to the participants to explore the value of potter, exchange knowledge, share interests and also discuss their challenges.

Climate 
The climate of the village is warm (22-28 degrees Celsius) between the months of October and April. However, the weather can be very warm from May to October.

References 

Populated places in Faiyum Governorate
Villages in Egypt